The Giants–Yankees rivalry is a Major League Baseball rivalry between the San Francisco Giants of the National League and the New York Yankees of the American League. It was particularly intense when both teams not only inhabited New York City but also, for a time, the same ball park. During that era the opportunities for them to meet could only have been in a World Series. Both teams kicked off the first Subway Series between the two leagues in 1921.

Cross-town Rivals

Highlanders Come to Town
The American League was at its infancy at the start of the 20th century. The current Yankees franchise had its origins in Baltimore as the Baltimore Orioles. At the time, rivalry between the National League and the American League was fierce. In 1902, long time National League executive John T. Brush gained a partial ownership interest in the Orioles, and released four key team members – Hall of Fame manager John McGraw, Hall of Fame pitcher Joe McGinnity, Hall of Fame catcher Roger Bresnahan and starting first baseman Dan McGann—from their Orioles' contract to join the National League New York Giants.  Brush also allowed other Orioles' players to join other National League teams.  Later that year, Brush became owner of the Giants.

The fledgling league realized they needed to capitalize on the big market of New York City and American League president Ban Johnson wanted revenge on McGraw and Brush for their antics with the Orioles.  So the American League moved the Orioles to New York, where the established National League Giants and the Brooklyn Dodgers teams were already located, over the Giants' and Dodgers' objections and despite their efforts to use their political influence within New York to prevent the move. The team was eventually called the Highlanders due to their homefield being on Hilltop Park from 1903–12.  The Highlanders had a successful season in 1904 and were just one game away from winning the pennant that year. Highlanders star pitcher Jack Chesbro, who had won 41 games that year (an AL record that still stands today), was pitching in the bottom of the 9th inning to their eventual fierce rival the Boston Americans. One of Chesbro's spitballs got away allowing Boston to score and win the game and pennant on the wild pitch. The modern day World Series was played in 1903 between the winners of the American League and the National League, but when the Giants won the NL pennant in 1904 they refused to play Boston in the fall classic. Giants' owner Brush stated "There is nothing in the constitution or playing rules of the National League which requires its victorious club to submit its championship honors to a contest with a victorious club in a minor league."  This move by the Giants made the 1905 season as the first one to have the World Series as the official matchup between the winners of the American and National Leagues.

Two Teams, One Field
The Giants briefly shared Hilltop Park as a home for two months in 1911 when the Polo Grounds was under reconstruction from a fire and relations between the two teams had warmed as a result. This paved way for the Highlanders to move into the new Polo Grounds in 1913. Now playing on the Harlem River, a far cry from their high-altitude home, the name "Highlanders" no longer applied, and fell into disuse among the press. The media had already widely adopted the "Yankees" nickname coined by the New York Press, and in 1913 the team became officially known as the New York Yankees.

By the mid-1910s, Yankees owners Farrell and Devery had become estranged and were both in need of money. At the start of 1915, they sold the team to Colonel Jacob Ruppert and Captain Tillinghast L'Hommedieu Huston for $463,000. Ruppert inherited a brewery fortune while Huston made his money as an engineer in Cuba after the Spanish–American War, providing the Yankees with an owner who possessed deep pockets and a willingness to dig into them to produce a winning team by making moves such as acquiring Boston star Babe Ruth in 1918.

First World Series meetings and eviction

Eviction notice and 1921 World Series

The home run-hitting exploits of Ruth proved so popular with the public that they began drawing more people than their landlords, the Giants.

The Giants' future Hall of Fame manager John McGraw hated the Yankees' slugging style of Ruth as opposed to the strategy of the dead ball era, and was said to have commented that the Yankees should "move to some out-of-the-way place, like Queens." This resulted in the inauguration of the heated Subway Series as previous matchups between the Giants and Brooklyn Dodgers were not referred to as Subway Series. The Yankees' matchup in the 1921 World Series were none other than their landlords, the Giants. This series saw the likes of several other future Hall of Famers in addition to Ruth and McGraw including Giants players Dave Bancroft, Frankie Frisch, George Kelly and Ross Youngs and Giants coaches Jesse Burkett, Christy Mathewson and Hughie Jennings, while Miller Huggins and Home Run Baker rounded out the Yankees. This series was also the last of the experimental best-of-nine format, with the Giants winning the championship five games to the Yankees' three.

1922 World Series: McGraw's last win

In 1922, the Yankees returned to the World Series, losing again to the Giants for the second straight year. The Giants showed talents from their previous year in addition to eventual Hall of Fame player Travis Jackson. There was also a Giants player who would become a Hall of Fame manager for the Yankees, Casey Stengel. The Yankees themselves saw the addition of a future Hall of Famer to their team in pitcher Waite Hoyt. The series was known to be controversial as it had the third and final tie game in World Series history when the game was called because of darkness. Conspiratorial allegations of impropriety of ticket sales had surfaced as a result of the game being called, causing Commissioner Landis to order proceeds to go to charities funding reconstruction efforts of World War I.

Meanwhile, the Yankees had broken ground for a new ballpark in the Bronx, right across the Harlem River from the Polo Grounds. The construction crew moved with remarkable speed and finished the new ballpark in less than a year.

Yankees move to the Bronx

1923 World Series: Yankees First World Series Championship

The Yankees moved from Manhattan borough to the Bronx with the opening of Yankee Stadium where, with their star Babe Ruth, they drew larger crowds than ever before. Their first year saw Ruth and future Hall of Famer Herb Pennock lead them to win their first World Series ever over none other than the Giants. Between the two teams, three rookies would eventually be inducted into the Hall of Fame but who did not play in the series: Bill Terry and Hack Wilson for the Giants and Lou Gehrig for the Yankees.

1936 World Series: New Legends Born

The teams went on to meet again in the fall classic over a decade later. Ruth had retired from baseball two years earlier and this was Joe DiMaggio's first. Giants Hall of Fame pitcher Carl Hubbell had won the first game for the Giants, but the Yankees rallied behind future Hall of Famers management of Joe McCarthy and the players Bill Dickey, Lefty Gomez, Tony Lazzeri, Red Ruffing and newly acquired left fielder Jake Powell's .455 avg, 10 hits, 8 runs and 4 walks to overwhelm Hubbell, Jackson and Giants legend Mel Ott to win the series 4 games to 2.

1937 World Series: Legends Last Hurrahs

Both teams met again this year in the classic. It was Gehrig's last outstanding season before amyotrophic lateral sclerosis (ALS) deteriorated his career. Gehrig's last World Series home run would be in this series off of Carl Hubbell in Hubbell's last inning pitched in the World Series. The Yankees became the first team in history to not commit any errors the entire series and eventually passed the Boston Red Sox and the Philadelphia Athletics for the most World Series wins, second only to the St. Louis Cardinals at the time.

When Gehrig retired, he received gifts from the Giants organization. In his famous farewell speech two years later spoke of the rivalry:

Mel Allen

In June 1939, announcer Mel Allen was hired by both teams to conduct play by play radio broadcasts. Allen was able to be the voice of broadcasts for both teams due to only home games being broadcast at the time. Allen would continue to broadcast for both the Giants and the Yankees until his entry into World War II in 1941. Upon his return, Allen only did Yankee broadcasts full-time up until 1964.

1951 World Series: The Last Giants–Yankees Subway Series, Passing of the Torch

Both teams met again in the 1951 World Series in what was a matchup of eccentric Hall of Fame managers. Leo Durocher of the Giants had led the Giants to the fall classic over Bobby Thomson's famous Shot Heard 'Round the World home run against the Brooklyn Dodgers. The Yankees had former Giants player Casey Stengel managing them. The Series would be the last for Joe DiMaggio and the first for the legendary Hall of Famers Mickey Mantle and Willie Mays. Several other All-Stars played, including Jim Hearn, Sal Maglie, Larry Jansen, Whitey Lockman, Alvin Dark and future Hall of Famer Monte Irvin for the Giants while Allie Reynolds, Vic Raschi, Gil McDougald, Eddie Lopat and future Hall of Famer Phil Rizzuto wore Yankee pinstripes.

The series proved to be the last Subway Series between the two clubs.

That would be their last World Series win in New York as well as franchise history up until .

Giants leave New York for San Francisco
The Giants had been contemplating a move from New York when they were seeking a new stadium away from the crumbling Polo Grounds. Initially, Giants ownership was thinking of moving to Minnesota. However, San Francisco had its mayor at the time, George Christopher, approach the Giants about relocation to San Francisco. Brooklyn Dodgers owner Walter O'Malley had already been in negotiations with the city of Los Angeles to move the Dodgers there. MLB would not authorize the move unless a second team would also move to California. In an effort to preserve their fierce rivalry, majority owner Horace Stoneham caved in and announced the move.

Joan Whitney Payson and M. Donald Grant were the only members of the Giants' ownership board who objected. They both eventually would become part of the ownership of the new New York baseball team 5 years later, the New York Mets, who would adopt the Giants' orange interlocking NY logo and their orange trim (mingled with royal blue from the Dodgers).

1962 World Series: The rivalry goes cross-country

The Yankees and Giants met for their first World Series in 1962 since the Giants had left. The series was closely contested by both teams. The Giants had better statistics in ERA, batting average (where the Yankees had one of the worst postseason averages ever) and all categories of extra base hits yet wound up losing the series in 7 games. It was remembered for a then record 13-day series due to excessive rainfall in both cities. Hall of Famers Yogi Berra, Whitey Ford, Orlando Cepeda, Juan Marichal and Willie McCovey joined Mantle and Mays in the rivalry. The final game featured a good defensive play by Roger Maris, who had just broken Babe Ruth's single season home run record the year prior. With the Yankees leading 1-0 and Matty Alou on first, Willie Mays doubled toward the right-field line. Maris cut off the ball and made a strong throw to prevent Alou from scoring the tying run; the play set up Willie McCovey's series-ending line drive to second baseman Bobby Richardson in what would be their last World Series matchup to date.

Recent developments and Interleague play

Since Interleague play started, the teams have had limited meetings. The Yankees visited newly built Pac Bell Park in March 2000 for a preseason series, marking their first visit to San Francisco in 38 years. June 6, 2002 was the first meeting between the two clubs since the 1962 World Series. The teams played at the old Yankee Stadium. Barry Bonds remarked that he wanted to touch something of the Babe's as a respect for the history there. Bonds hit a home run and later became the only player in MLB history to hit in all existing baseball stadiums during his playing career.

May 28, 2006 saw Bonds pass Ruth on the all time home run list as he hit his career number 715 off Colorado Rockies pitcher Byung-hyun Kim (who himself has a history with the Yankees giving up two walk off home runs to them in the 2001 World Series when he was with the Arizona Diamondbacks). Bonds would also break another record once held by Ruth, and then later by Maris, of the most home runs hit in a single season when he won away the award from St. Louis Cardinal slugger Mark McGwire who had done so in 1998. Bonds would finish his career with 1,996 RBI, one ahead of legendary Yankee Lou Gehrig.

Years later, the Giants hosted the Yankees at AT&T Park for the first time ever and won the series that included Bonds, Roger Clemens, Mariano Rivera, Derek Jeter and Alex Rodriguez. Former Yankee hero Dave Righetti was the Giants pitching coach for the series that saw Bonds hit his 749th home run as he eventually moved towards becoming the all-time home run king. Both of these series had the Yankees managed by Joe Torre, a Brooklyn native who was a Giants fan growing up when they were still in New York. In August 2010, Jeter passed Mel Ott for the most hits for a New York-based team. Later that month, Jeter went on to tie Bonds for getting 10 home runs and 10 stolen bases for 15 years straight. Shortly after that, Alex Rodriguez joined Bonds and Willie Mays as the only players to ever hit 600 home runs and steal 300 bases. In April 2011, Jeter passed Bonds on the all-time hits list.

The Yankees hosted the Giants for the first time at the new Yankee Stadium in September 2013. Alex Rodriguez became the all-time grand slam leader when he hit his career 24th against the Giants on September 20, 2013. Two days later, the Yankees honored Mariano Rivera for his career and retired his number. Metal band Metallica played their famous song Enter Sandman as part of the ceremony due to Rivera using it as his entrance song throughout his career. Dave Righetti, who previously held the Yankees all-time saves record prior to Rivera, and other former Yankees on the Giants coaching staff presented Rivera with an electric guitar designed by Metallica with the Yankees logo and Giants logo surrounding Rivera's #42 and signed by Willie Mays. Prior to the series, long time Yankees legend Andy Pettitte announced he would retire after the season. Pettitte started the game for the Yankees and threw several innings of perfect baseball, but it would not be enough as the Giants would deflate the Yankees festivities of the day by going on to win the game 2-1.

The Yankees most recent championship was a victory during the 2009 World Series. This was the team's first and, to date, only championship in their new stadium. The following year, the Giants made a historic run to win their first World Series in San Francisco led by Rookie of the Year catcher Buster Posey. Posey and the Giants would win again in the 2012 World Series and the 2014 World Series. Derek Jeter's initial impact and multiple world championships early on in his career drew comparisons of him to Buster Posey.

The most recent series between the Giants and Yankees occurred the weekend of April 26–28, 2019, at the newly renamed Oracle Park. Now, every team has to play each other at least once. It will be in New York in odd numbered years, and in San Francisco in even numbered years.

See also
Major League Baseball rivalries
Subway Series
History of the New York Giants
History of the San Francisco Giants
History of the New York Yankees
49ers–Giants rivalry, a football rivalry between NFL teams the San Francisco 49ers and New York Giants (the latter of whom was named after the Giants baseball team)

References

New York Yankees
San Francisco Giants
Interleague play
Major League Baseball rivalries